Thogata (also known as Thogata, Thogataru, Thogatiga, Thogataveera, Thogataveera Kshathriya, Thogatagera and Thogaja Pushpanjali) are a Hindu community of weavers found in Andhra Pradesh, Karnataka, Telangana, Maharashtra and South Odisha. They claim descent from Chowdeswari and follow Vaishnavite tradition.

References 

Social groups of Karnataka
Indian castes
Weaving communities of South Asia
Social groups of Andhra Pradesh